Constantin Titoiu is a retired amateur boxer from Romania. At the 1982 World Amateur Boxing Championships he won the bronze medal in the flyweight division (– 51 kg). In the semifinals he was beaten by eventual silver medalist Michael Collins of the United States. He also won five national senior titles and two bronze medals at the European Amateur Boxing Championships.

References

External links

Living people
Romanian male boxers
AIBA World Boxing Championships medalists
Flyweight boxers
1958 births